Live from Wembley or Live from Wembley Arena may refer to:

 Girls Aloud: The Greatest Hits Live from Wembley Arena, a 2006 DVD
 Pink: Live from Wembley Arena, a 2007 DVD

See also
 Live at Wembley (disambiguation)